Master: A Building in Copacabana is a 2002 Brazilian documentary film by Eduardo Coutinho, about residents of a building in the Copacabana, Rio de Janeiro.

In the 2010s it was ranked as number 28 on the Abraccine Top 100 Brazilian films list and also number 4 in the documentary list.

Plot
The film presents the daily lives of the residents of Edifício Master, in Copacabana, and shows a rich panel of stories. With 276 apartments and 12 floors, the place serves as a home for the interviewees, who reveal dramas, solitude, desires and vanities.

Promotion
The film had its premiere at the Festival de Gramado in August 2002 and won the Best Documentary Award.

The film made subsequent appearances at the Rio de Janeiro International Film Festival, the São Paulo International Film Festival, the Havana Film Festival, the Amsterdam International Documentary Film Festival, among others.

Accolades

References

External links
 

2002 documentary films
2002 films
Brazilian documentary films
2000s Portuguese-language films